John Ralph Laing (born 27 August 1942) is a Scottish former first-class cricketer and administrator.

Laing was born at Meigle in August 1942. He was educated at Alyth School. A club cricketer for Perthshire County Cricket Club, Laing made his debut for Scotland in first-class cricket against Warwickshire at Edgbaston in 1969. He played first-class cricket for Scotland until 1979, having made eight appearances. In these he scored 301 runs at an average of 21.50, with a highest score of 217 not out coming against Ireland in 1976. Laing was later appointed president of the Scottish Cricket Union in 1992. Outside of cricket, Laing was a potato merchant. His brother, Gordon, was also a first-class cricketer.

References

External links
 

1942 births
Living people
Cricketers from Perth and Kinross
Scottish cricketers
Scottish cricket administrators